Kagoshima at-large district is a constituency in the House of Councillors of Japan, the upper house of the Diet of Japan (national legislature). It currently elects two members to the House of Councillors, one per election.

Outline
The constituency represents the entire population of Kagoshima Prefecture and has  registered voters as of September 2015.

As of 2021, the current representatives are:
 Hidehisa Otsuji, first elected in 1989. Up for election in 2025. Member of the Liberal Democratic Party.
 Tetsuro Nomura, first elected in 2004. Up for election in 2022. Member of the Liberal Democratic Party.

Elected members
People in this district elected the following members of the House of Councillors.

  - 1947 (nonparty)
  - 1947 (nonparty), 1953 (LP), 1959 (LDP), 1965 (LDP)
  - 1947 fill-in member (nonparty)
 Tadahiko Shimadzu - 1947 fill-in member (nonparty), 1950 (LP)
  - 1947 by-election (DP)
  - 1947 by-election (nonparty)
  - 1950 (JSP), 1956 (JSP), 1962 (JSP)
  - 1953 (LP)
  - 1956 (LDP)
  - 1956 by-election (LDP), 1962 (LDP), 1968 (LDP)
  - 1959 (LDP), 1965 (LDP)
  - 1968 (LDP)
  - 1971 (LDP)
  - 1971 (JSP)
  - 1974 (LDP), 1980 (LDP), 1986 (LDP), 1992 (LDP), 1998 (LDP)
 Wataru Kubo - 1974 (JSP), 1983 (JSP), 1989 (JSP), 1995 (JSP)
  - 1975 by-election (LDP)
  - 1977 (LDP), 1983 (LDP)
  - 1977 (nonparty)
  - 1980 (LDP), 1986 (LDP)
  - 1989 (LDP), 1995 (LDP)
  - 1992 (JSP)
 Hiroshi Moriyama - 1998 (LDP)
 Yoshito Kajiya - 2001 (LDP), 2007 (LDP)
 Tetsuro Nomura - 2004 (LDP), 2010 (LDP), 2016 (LDP)
 Hidehisa Otsuji - 2013 (LDP), 2019 (LDP)

See also
List of districts of the House of Councillors of Japan

References 

Kagoshima
Districts of the House of Councillors (Japan)